Bani Bukari is a sub-district located in the Jabal Habashi District, Taiz Governorate, Yemen. Bani Bukari had a population of 6,318 according to the 2004 census.

References 

Sub-districts in Jabal Habashi District